Anolis gibbiceps, the hook anole, is a species of lizard in the family Dactyloidae. The species is found in French Guiana, Venezuela, Guyana, and Suriname.

References

Anoles
Reptiles of French Guiana
Reptiles of Venezuela
Reptiles of Guyana
Reptiles of Suriname
Reptiles described in 1864
Taxa named by Edward Drinker Cope